Nuri Seferi (born 23 December 1976) is an Albanian professional boxer who competes out of Burgdorf, Switzerland.

Biography
Seferi was born in Gostivar, SFR Yugoslavia (present-day North Macedonia) and is of Albanian heritage. Whilst in Yugoslavia as an eight-year-old he started wrestling, a sport which his grandfather had competed in professionally. In 1992 his family fled from Gostivar and moved to Burgdorf, Switzerland. Seferi found it hard to adapt to the lifestyle and language change, and as he was 15 at the time he was too old for compulsory education. He took up boxing in order to help with integration into Swiss society. He began to train under the guidance of trainer Sandor Konya at a local gym in Burgdorf, but he also trained with legendary Swiss martial artist and kickboxer Andy Hug as well.

Amateur career
With a perfect record of 10 wins with 9 knockouts as an amateur, Seferi became the Swiss amateur heavyweight champion in 1998. Shortly after winning the title however he began to focus on turning professional and retired a successful amateur career undefeated.

Professional
He made his professional debut on 31 March 1999 against Slovakian Miroslav Dzurenda in Worb, Switzerland. The 22-year-old Seferi won the fight by a knockout in the first round. his first defeat came on 16 June 2001 to Ukrainian Kostyantyn Okhrey, with Seferi being unable to continue in the 4th round due to a rib injury. Of his first 10 wins in 6 round bouts, all were won by knockouts in the first 4 rounds, with 6 knockouts coming in the opening rounds.

On 7 July 2012 Seferi made his comeback fight following his operation against Giulian Ilie in Bern, Switzerland before the Wladimir Klitschko v 
Tony Thompson bout. Seferi started the fight poorly, getting outfoxed and unable to match Ilie's speed. However, he gained momentum in the latter rounds and knocked down his opponent in the sixth and eighth round respectively to win on points over the 8 rounds.

He fought Steve Herelius on 7 December 2013. Seferi dominated the fight, but his opponent got disqualified in the 7th round.

He was defeated by Krzysztof Glowacki in January 2015.

He won the WBO European Cruiserweight title on 26 June 2010 and defended his title successfully four times until losing to Krzysztof Głowacki on 31 January 2015.

Personal life
He has a younger brother, Sefer Seferi who is also a professional boxer in the cruiserweight division. In December 2011, Nuri and his brother Sefer were named honorary citizens of their birthplace, Gostivar in Macedonia by the city's mayor Rufi Osmani.

Professional boxing record

References

External links
Boxrec Profile

1976 births
Living people
Swiss people of Albanian descent
Swiss people of Macedonian descent
Macedonian emigrants to Switzerland
People from Gostivar
Swiss male boxers
People from Burgdorf, Switzerland
Cruiserweight boxers
Albanian male boxers